Sir Thomas Ekins Fuller   (1831–1910) was editor of the Cape Argus newspaper and a prominent Member of the Legislative Assembly of the Cape Colony.

Initially a moderate follower of the "Cape Liberal Tradition", he advocated for responsible government (local democracy) in the 1860s as editor of the Cape Argus newspaper (1864-1873). He also supported the inclusive, locally oriented politics of his liberal allies at the time.

Between 1873 and 1875 he worked with immigration in London, before returning to the Cape to become General Manager of the Union Steamship Company (1875-1898) and Member of the Legislative Assembly of the Cape Colony (MLA for Cape Town, 1879-1900).

Although initially a liberal, in later life, he came to be greatly influenced by the imperialist Cecil Rhodes, of whom he eventually became a devoted admirer. Finally in 1898, he even became a director of the De Beers Consolidated Mines Company.

References

External links
 

Knights Commander of the Order of St Michael and St George
Fuller
19th-century South African people
South African newspaper editors
19th-century journalists
Male journalists
1831 births
1910 deaths
19th-century male writers